The 2016 American Athletic Conference women's basketball tournament was a tournament held  March 4–7 in the Mohegan Sun Arena in Uncasville, Connecticut. Connecticut won their third straight American Athletic Conference title by defeating South Florida and earn an automatic trip to the NCAA women's basketball tournament.

Seeds
All the teams in the American Athletic Conference qualified for the tournament. Teams were seeded based on conference record, and then a tiebreaker system was used. Teams seeded 6–11 played in the opening round, and teams seeded 1–5 received a bye to the quarterfinals.

Schedule
All tournament games are nationally televised on an ESPN network:

Bracket

Note: * denotes overtime

See also
 2016 American Athletic Conference men's basketball tournament

References

American Athletic Conference women's basketball tournament
2015–16 American Athletic Conference women's basketball season
2016 in sports in Connecticut
College basketball tournaments in Connecticut
Sports competitions in Uncasville, Connecticut